Monsters We Met is a documentary produced by the BBC that later aired as a special on Animal Planet in 2004 (under the title, Land of Lost Monsters) which also included footage from Walking with Beasts and Walking with Cavemen (both also made by the BBC). The show used computer-generated imagery to recreate the life of the giant animals that lived during the last ice age and explains how early humans encountered them. It also features humans as the main reason for the extinction of all great animals.

Episodes

Episode 1: The Eternal Frontier (Montana, United States, North America, 11,000 years ago)
Original air date: August 8, 2003
 Woolly mammoth (Mammuthus primigenius)
 American lion (Panthera atrox, live-acted by an African lioness)
 Scimitar-tooth cat (Homotherium latidens)
 North American saber-tooth cat (Smilodon fatalis)
 Harlan's ground sloth (Paramylodon harlani)
 Camelops hesternus (live-acted by a Bactrian camel, edited to have one hump)
 Giant short-faced bear (Arctodus simus)
 Steppe bison (live-acted by an American bison)
 Hagerman horse (Equus simplicidens, live-acted by a Grevy's zebra)
 American cheetah (Miracinonyx genus, live-acted by a snow leopard)
 Stilt-legged horse (Haringtonhippus francisci, live acted by a onager)
 Horse (Equus ferus)
 Yukon wild horse (Equus ferus lambei, live acted by a Przewalski's horse)
 Domestic horse (Equus ferus caballus, live acted)
 Grey wolf (Canis lupus)
 Northern Rocky Mountain wolf  (Canis lupus irremotus, live-acted)
 Domestic dog (Canis lupus familiaris, live-acted by an Alaskan Malamute)
 American bison (Bison bison, live-acted)
 Teratorn (Teratornis genus, live acted by an Andean condor)
 Muskox (Ovibos moschatus, live-acted)
 Caribou (Rangifer tarandus, live-acted)
 Saiga antelope (Saiga tatarica, live-acted)
 Dall sheep (Ovis dalli, live acted)
 Common raven (Corvus corax, live-acted)
 Bald eagle (Haliaeetus leucocephalus, live acted by a juvenile specimen)
 Golden eagle (Aquila chrysaetos, live-acted)
 Wolverine (Gulo gulo, live-acted)
 Snowshoe hare (Lepus americanus, live-acted)
 White-tailed deer (Odocoileus virginianus, live-acted)
 Snowy owl (Bubo scandiacus, live-acted)
 Sockeye salmon (Oncorhynchus nerka, being eaten by a juvenile bald eagle)
The episode starts with mammoths living during the Ice Age. It also shows how early indigenous Americans became top predators and started hunting them. Early Americans also had to compete with other predators like the Short-faced Bear and the Saber-toothed Cat. They destroyed them by depleting their food supply and making them starve to death. The episode ends with how there were no more extinctions following the Ice Age and that it remained that way until the European colonization.

Note: This episode used most of the extinct mammal models from Wild New World, as well as some archive footage. The episode also shows an archive footage from Walking with Beasts.

Episode 2: The Burning (Australia, 65,000 years ago)
Original air date: April 15, 2003
Mihirung (Genyornis newtoni)
Diprotodon optatum
Megalania (Varanus priscus)
Saltwater crocodile (Crocodylus porosus, live-acted)
Red kangaroo (Osphranter rufus, live-acted)
Emu (Dromaius novaehollandiae, live-acted)
Perentie (Varanus giganteus, live-acted)
Frilled lizard (Chlamydosaurus kingii, live-acted)
Red-tailed black cockatoo (Calyptorhynchus banksii, live-acted)
Brown snake (Pseudonaja genus, live-acted)
Green ants (Oecophylla smaragdina, live-acted)
Stick insect (Phasmatodea order, live-acted)
Bat (Chiroptera order, live-acted)
Crab (Brachyura infraorder, live-acted)
It starts by showing how early Aboriginal Australians migrated to Australia. They also hunted the native wildlife, encountering large birds and the giant monitor lizard, megalania. The reptiles kill two humans and they plan on burning the fields to kill the giant lizard. The episode then ends with how the burning of the forests changed the landscape of Australia.

Episode 3: The End of Eden (New Zealand, CE 1280)
Original air date: April 22, 2003
South Island giant moa (Dinornis robustus)
Haast's eagle or poukai (Hieraaetus moorei, live-acted by a harpy eagle)
Common bottlenose dolphin (Tursiops truncatus, live-acted)
Sperm whale (Physeter macrocephalus, only the tail is seen)
New Zealand sea lion or whakahao (Phocarctos hookeri, live-acted)
Kelp gull (Larus dominicanus, live-acted)
North Island kōkako (Callaeas wilsoni, live-acted)
Snares penguin (Eudyptes robustus, live-acted)
Kea (Nestor notabilis, live-acted)
Kakapo (Strigops habroptilus, live-acted)
Giant wētā (Deinacrida genus, live-acted)
Southern brown kiwi (Apteryx australis, live-acted)
Tuatara (Sphenodon punctatus, live-acted)
New Zealand lesser short-tailed bat (Mystacina tuberculata, live-acted)
Polynesian rat or kiore (Rattus exulans, live-acted)
Grey wolf (Canis lupus)
Domestic Dog - Kurī breed (Canis lupus familiaris, live-acted by mongrel dogs)
Sumatran rhinoceros (Dicerorhinus sumatrensis, live-acted)
Lion (Panthera leo, live-acted)
Common hippopotamus (Hippopotamus amphibius, live-acted)
Nile crocodile (Crocodylus niloticus, live-acted)
Plains zebra (Equus quagga, live-acted)
Impala (Aepyceros melampus, live-acted)
Australopithecus afarensis
Dinofelis
Common eland (Taurotragus oryx, live-acted)
Columbian mammoth (Mammuthus columbi)
Glyptotherium
Jaguar (Panthera onca, live-acted)
Domestic sheep (Ovis aries, live-acted)
ʻIʻiwi (Drepanis coccinea, live-acted)
Brown rat (Rattus norvegicus, live-acted)
Rock dove (Columba livia, live acted) 
Domestic cat (Felis catus, live-acted)
Red junglefowl (Gallus gallus)
Chicken (Gallus gallus domesticus, live-acted)
It starts with the Māori populating New Zealand during the Middle Ages. They encounter the giant moa and start to see that it was harmless. They then discover Haast's eagle, which hunts moas and starts to target them. They then start to steal the moa's giant eggs and go after the adults for food. The program then goes into human evolution and goes over how humans have led to the extinctions of the megafauna and how they are still affecting modern animals. The program ends with a scene of space and starts to ask the question about the environmental impact of humanity stating "that if we can't live with these monsters, are we monsters ourselves?".

Note: This episode used footage from the previous two episodes, Walking with Cavemen, Walking with Beasts and Wild New World. The episode also showed a footage from one episode of Walking with Dinosaurs.

See also
Paleoworld
Dinosaur Planet (TV series)
When Dinosaurs Roamed America
Monsters We Met is part of a series of BBC documentaries that also include:
Walking with Dinosaurs (1999)
Walking with Beasts (2001), depicting life after the dinosaurs
Walking with Cavemen (2003)
Walking with Monsters (2005), depicting life before the dinosaurs
The following are Walking With... series specials:
The Ballad of Big Al (2000)
Chased by Dinosaurs (2002)
Sea Monsters (2003)
The following are similar programs, produced by the BBC:
"Prehistoric America" (2002)

References

External links
 
 BBC official website (via Wayback Machine
 Animal Planets Official website (Via Wayback Machine)
 TV Guide
 

BBC television documentaries
BBC television documentaries about history
Documentary films about prehistoric life
Animal Planet original programming
2003 British television series debuts
2003 British television series endings
Prehistoric people in popular culture